is Latin for Solemn Mass, and is a genre of musical settings of the Mass Ordinary, which are festively scored and render the Latin text extensively, opposed to the more modest Missa brevis. In French, the genre is "Messe solennelle". The terms came into use in the classical period.

When "Missa solemnis" is used as a name, without referring to a composer, Beethoven's work is generally implied. Some of the greatest compositions in the genre have unique common names other than "Missa solemnis"—namely, Bach's Mass in B minor and Mozart's Great Mass in C minor. Some works are solemn settings in proportion and scoring, but are not called a "Missa solemnis", for example several late settings of both Haydn and Schubert, and three settings by Anton Bruckner.

A solemn mass has been written by well-known composers including:
 Bach: Mass in B minor (1733/1749)
 Beethoven: Missa solemnis in D major (1823)
 Berlioz: Messe solennelle (1824)
 Bruckner: Missa solemnis in B flat minor (1854)
 Cherubini: Messa solenne "Per il Principe Esterházy" (1811)
 Haydn: Missa in tempore belli (Mass in the Time of War) in C major, (1796)
 Hummel: Missa solemnis in C major (1806)
 Liszt: Missa solennis zur Einweihung der Basilika in Gran (Gran Mass) (first version 1855, second version 1857–58)
 Mozart: Mass in C minor, K. 139 "Waisenhaus" (1768)
 Mozart: Mass in C major, K. 337 "Solemnis" (1780)
 Mozart: Great Mass in C minor, K. 427 (1782/1783)
 Rossini: Petite messe solennelle (1863)
 Schubert: Mass No. 1, Mass No. 4, Mass No. 5, Mass No. 6
 Vierne: Messe solennelle
 Weber: Missa solemnis No. 2 (1818–1819) "Messe du Freischutz"

Other composers who wrote works titled "Missa solemnis" have included France Ačko (1941), Hendrik Andriessen (1946), Marco Betta, František Brixi, Antonio Buonomo (1983), Alfredo Casella (1944), Paul Creston, Georg Druschetzky (1804), Bohumil Fidler (1901), Joseph-Hector Fiocco, Konstanty Gorski, Michael Haydn (1772), Václav Emanuel Horák, Sigurd Islandsmoen (1954), Friedrich Kiel, Karel Blažej Kopřiva, Jean Langlais, Josef Lammerz (1990), Colin Mawby, Boleslaw Ocias, Antonio Sacchini, Johann Nepomuk Schelble, Wolfgang Seifen, Johann Baptist Wanhal (1778), and Bedřich Antonín Wiedermann (1848).

Festive mass settings in other languages include Jakub Jan Ryba's Czech Christmas Mass.

Christian liturgical music